Bridge in Metal Township, also known as Keggereis Ford Bridge, is a historic multi-span concrete arch bridge located at Metal Township in Franklin County, Pennsylvania. It was constructed in 1907. It carries Stone Bridge Road (State Route 4006) over the West Branch Conococheague Creek.

It was listed on the National Register of Historic Places in 1988.

See also
List of bridges documented by the Historic American Engineering Record in Pennsylvania

References

External links

Road bridges on the National Register of Historic Places in Pennsylvania
Bridges completed in 1907
Bridges in Franklin County, Pennsylvania
Historic American Engineering Record in Pennsylvania
National Register of Historic Places in Franklin County, Pennsylvania
Arch bridges in the United States
Concrete bridges in the United States